Taiwanomyia is a genus of crane fly in the family Limoniidae.

Distribution
Malaysia, Japan, India, Philippines, Thailand, China, Papua New Guinea & Taiwan

Species
T. alticola (Edwards, 1926)
T. babaella Alexander, 1957
T. brevicornis Alexander, 1967
T. brevissima Alexander, 1967
T. cavernicola (Brunetti, 1924)
T. cotabatoensis (Alexander, 1934)
T. filicornis (Alexander, 1924)
T. fragilicornis (Riedel, 1917)
T. hispivena Alexander, 1967
T. inobsepta Alexander, 1970
T. lativertex (Alexander, 1950)
T. perpendicularis (Alexander, 1954)
T. perretracta (Alexander, 1954)
T. pollosta Alexander, 1967
T. ritozanensis (Alexander, 1929)
T. seticornis (Alexander, 1926)
T. setulosa Alexander, 1967
T. sicula Alexander, 1967
T. szechwanensis (Alexander, 1933)
T. tafana (Alexander, 1947)

References

Limoniidae
Diptera of Australasia
Diptera of Asia